Into The Woods is the second studio album by Scottish singer-songwriter, Malcolm Middleton, released on 13 June 2005 on Chemikal Underground.

Overview
In 2005, Malcolm recorded and released the critically acclaimed album Into The Woods. The album was originally going to be called The Great Bear. The album featured guest appearances from Stuart Braithwaite and Barry Burns (of Mogwai), members of The Delgados, The Reindeer Section and Aidan Moffat. Malcolm has commented on the album, saying

Track listing
Songs, lyrics and music by Malcolm Middleton.
"Break My Heart" – 4:14
"Devastation" – 3:23
"Loneliness Shines" – 4:19
"No Modest Bear" – 2:27
"Monday Night Nothing" – 3:27
"Bear With Me" – 6:08
"A Happy Medium" – 3:01
"Autumn" – 3:44
"Burst Noel" – 2:46
"Choir" – 4:54
"Solemn Thirsty" – 5:15
"A New Heart" – 2:51
"Break My Heart" and "Loneliness Shines"/"No Modest Bear" were released as singles.

Personnel
Malcolm Middleton – guitar, vocals, producer
Paul Savage – drums, engineer, producer
Aidan Moffat – drums
Alan Barr – cello
Geoff Allan – engineer
Barry Burns – piano, hammond organ, Fender Rhodes
Stuart Braithwaite – guitar
Jenny Reeve – violin

Release history
Into the Woods was released in various countries in 2005.

Notes

Into The Woods
Malcolm Middleton albums
Chemikal Underground albums